In Pieces is the upcoming debut solo studio album by American singer-songwriter Chlöe. It is set to be released through Parkwood Entertainment and Columbia Records on March 31, 2023.

Background 

After eight years of releasing music under duo act Chloe x Halle, Chlöe began recording music for a solo project in late 2019. This was put on hold so that she and her sister could focus on promoting their critically acclaimed album, Ungodly Hour (2020).

In January 2021, the sisters created separate Instagram accounts after having shared one for nine years under the Chloe x Halle name. Halle was away from Chlöe for many months during this time, filming the 2023 live adaptation of The Little Mermaid abroad after landing the lead role. This was one of the longest periods they'd ever been apart. Chlöe took to creating music by herself as a form of therapy. She started recording under the impression it would make part of Chloe x Halle's third album, but the music ultimately evolved into the groundwork for a solo project.

Chlöe called the album "90% done" when speaking to Billboard in August 2021. She then revealed that she had been working on her debut album throughout the pandemic and that it would be self-titled. Then, in March 2022, she announced via Twitter that the album was complete. On March 16, she revealed the album cover art, which was widely compared to that of And in the Darkness, Hearts Aglow by Weyes Blood.

Promotion 
On January 24, the singer announced her upcoming debut album with a short teaser video, previewing the song "Heart on My Sleeve". In the video, Chlöe wears "a sleek red leather gown, acting as a scale as she holds a human heart on one arm and a sphere on the other." Chlöe had originally chosen for the album to be self-titled but reworked the name to In Pieces because the music had "change[d] and it felt more vulnerable and raw." The album is set to be released on March 31, 2023, with the release date officially being announced with another teaser video, previewing the song "What About Me". Speaking to Complex in January, she said "every single song on [the] project stems from my own experiences" and that fans could look forward to "exciting features and collaborations."

On February 21, 2023, Beats Electronics released a commercial for a color collection of the Beats Fit Pro, premiering one of the upcoming songs from Chlöe's album "Body Do".

Singles 
After her recent album announcement, she teased an upcoming single through social media. The single titled "Pray It Away" was released on January 27, 2023, alongside a music video. The song is co-produced by the artist herself, ThankGod4Cody, ECassshh, Pitt Tha Kid, and Puredandy. The music video is directed by Madeline Kate Kann. The second single "How Does It Feel", featuring Chris Brown, was released on February 24, 2023, along with an accompanying music video.

Scrapped singles 
Between September 2021 and October 2022, Chlöe released four singles intended for her debut album: "Have Mercy", "Treat Me", "Surprise", and "For the Night" (featuring Latto). These were announced as scrapped from the album following the release of "Pray It Away", the new lead single from the album. She later explained that the album had evolved past the sound of the previous singles.

Tour 

On February 28, 2023, Chlöe took to social media to announce she would be touring in North America during the Spring of 2023. The In Pieces Tour will be her first headlining tour as a solo artist, consisting of shows across 11 cities in the United States and Canada. The tour is scheduled to begin at the Riviera Theatre in Chicago, Illinois on April 11, with the final tour date being held at The Novo in Los Angeles, California on May 3. Tickets for the North American dates went on sale on March 3 via Ticketmaster.

Track listing

Release history

Notes

References 

Columbia Records albums
Upcoming albums
2023 debut albums